Robert S. Van Dillen (born October 6, 1972), occasionally known as Bobby Van Dillen, is an former American meteorologist currently working on the Morning Express with Robin Meade show on HLN.

He was born in Montclair, New Jersey. He moved to the Shongum Lake section of Randolph, New Jersey in 1977 and graduated in 1991 from Randolph High School.

Van Dillen earned a Bachelor of Science degree in meteorology from Millersville University of Pennsylvania.  He began his career in Long Island, New York, as a forecaster for the Metro Weather Service.  He subsequently worked for ABC affiliate WUTR in Utica, New York, CBS affiliate WTVH in Syracuse, New York, and NBC affiliate WCNC-TV in Charlotte, North Carolina. He began working at CNN world headquarters in Atlanta in September 2002.

Van Dillen was awarded the American Meteorological Society (AMS) Seal of Approval in March 1997 and is a full member of the AMS.

References

External links
Bob Van Dillen's CNN bio page.

American television journalists
American television meteorologists
1972 births
Living people
CNN people
Millersville University of Pennsylvania alumni
People from Montclair, New Jersey
People from Randolph, New Jersey
Randolph High School (New Jersey) alumni
American male journalists